Out with the Tide is a 1928 American silent drama film directed by Charles Hutchison and starring Dorothy Dwan, Cullen Landis and Crauford Kent.

Cast
 Dorothy Dwan as Joan Renshaw 
 Cullen Landis as John Templeton 
 Crauford Kent as Ralph Kennedy 
 Mitchell Lewis as Captain Lund 
 Ernest Hilliard as Snake Doyle 
 Sôjin Kamiyama as Chee Chee 
 Jimmy Aubrey as Jimmy 
 Arthur Thalasso as Clancey

References

Bibliography
 Munden, Kenneth White. The American Film Institute Catalog of Motion Pictures Produced in the United States, Part 1. University of California Press, 1997.

External links

1928 films
1928 drama films
Silent American drama films
Films directed by Charles Hutchison
American silent feature films
1920s English-language films
American black-and-white films
Films set in Shanghai
1920s American films